Hypoxia means a lower than normal level of oxygen, and may refer to:

Reduced or insufficient oxygen
 Hypoxia (environmental), abnormally low oxygen content of the specific environment
 Hypoxia (medical), abnormally low level of oxygen in the tissues
 Autoerotic hypoxia or erotic asphyxiation, intentional restriction of oxygen to the brain for sexual arousal
 Cerebral hypoxia, a reduced supply of oxygen to the brain
 Diffusion hypoxia or Fink effect, a factor that influences the partial pressure of oxygen within the pulmonary alveolus
 Histotoxic hypoxia, the inability of cells to take up or use oxygen from the bloodstream
 Hypoxemic hypoxia or hypoxemia, a deficiency of oxygen in arterial blood
 Hypoxic hypoxia, a result of insufficient oxygen available to the lungs
 Intrauterine hypoxia, when a fetus is deprived of an adequate supply of oxygen
 Generalized hypoxia is hypoxia distributed amongst all tissues
 Latent hypoxia is artificially raised oxygen concentration in the blood due to high ambient pressure and will reduce when the pressure is reduced to normal, associated with freediving blackout.
 Pseudohypoxia, increased cytosolic ratio of free NADH to NAD+ in cells
 Tumor hypoxia, the situation where tumor cells have been deprived of oxygen
 Hypoxia in fish, responses of fish to hypoxia

Music
 Hypoxia (album), by Kathryn Williams, 2015
 Hypoxia, an album by Projected, or the title song, 2022
 "Hypoxia", a song by Delerium from Spheres 2, 1994
 "Hypoxia", a song by Thomas Giles from Pulse, 2011